The Veiled Detective is a 2004 mystery pastiche novel written by David Stuart Davies, that presents an alternate history of the life of Dr. John Watson and his relationship with Sherlock Holmes.

Plot
John Watson is not named Watson, but rather Dr. John H. Walker. On his return to England, he is recruited by the criminal mastermind Professor James Moriarty to spy on the young but intellectually intimidating Sherlock Holmes. Walker agrees to take on the task, and taking on a new name, forms a lifelong acquaintance with Holmes that will test his resolve and his values.

Reception
Abel Diaz for Blasting News enjoyed the first two-thirds of the book, but felt that it lost momentum in the end. "It may come up a bit short against other Sherlock classics, with a conclusion that didn't make the most of the book's premise, but the first two thirds and Davies' storytelling skills were so good I left satisfied."

Reissues
Titan Books reprinted the book in 2009, under the title of The Further Adventures of Sherlock Holmes: The Veiled Detective as part of its Further Adventures series, which collects a number of noted pastiches.

See also

 Sherlock Holmes pastiches

References

External links
The Veiled Detective at Titan Books

2004 novels
England in fiction
Sherlock Holmes novels
Sherlock Holmes pastiches
Robert Hale books